Xiruana is a genus of South American anyphaenid sac spiders first described by Antônio Brescovit in 1997.

Species
 it contains seventeen species:
Xiruana affinis (Mello-Leitão, 1922) – Brazil
Xiruana ajuricaba Oliveira & Brescovit, 2015 – Brazil
Xiruana aymara Oliveira & Brescovit, 2015 – Bolivia
Xiruana bifida Oliveira & Brescovit, 2015 – Brazil, Paraguay
Xiruana cocha Oliveira & Brescovit, 2015 – Peru
Xiruana fiebrigi Oliveira & Brescovit, 2015 – Paraguay
Xiruana gracilipes (Keyserling, 1891) – Brazil, Bolivia, Argentina
Xiruana guaia Oliveira & Brescovit, 2015 – Brazil
Xiruana hirsuta (Mello-Leitão, 1938) – Venezuela, Brazil, Paraguay, Argentina, Uruguay
Xiruana jaboticabal Oliveira & Brescovit, 2015 – Brazil
Xiruana lusitania Oliveira & Brescovit, 2015 – Brazil
Xiruana minacu Oliveira & Brescovit, 2015 – Brazil
Xiruana pocone Oliveira & Brescovit, 2015 – Brazil, Paraguay, Argentina
Xiruana silarae Oliveira & Brescovit, 2015 – Brazil
Xiruana tapirape Oliveira & Brescovit, 2015 – Brazil
Xiruana tetraseta (Mello-Leitão, 1939) – Venezuela, Brazil, Paraguay
Xiruana tribarrense Oliveira & Brescovit, 2015 – Brazil

References

Anyphaenidae
Araneomorphae genera
Spiders of South America
Taxa named by Antônio Brescovit